A revolutionary wave or revolutionary decade is one series of revolutions occurring in various locations within a similar time-span. In many cases, past revolutions and revolutionary waves have inspired current ones, or an initial revolution has inspired other concurrent "affiliate revolutions" with similar aims.
The causes of revolutionary waves have become the subjects of study by historians and political philosophers, including Robert Roswell Palmer, Crane Brinton, Hannah Arendt, Eric Hoffer, and Jacques Godechot.

Writers and activists, including Justin Raimondo and Michael Lind, have used the phrase "revolutionary wave" to describe discrete revolutions happening within a short time-span.

Typology
Mark N. Katz identified six forms of revolution;
rural revolution
urban revolution
Coup d'état, e.g. Egypt, 1952
revolution from above, e.g. Mao's Great Leap Forward of 1958
revolution from without, e.g. the allied invasions of Italy, 1944 and Germany, 1945.
revolution by osmosis, e.g. the gradual Islamization of several countries.

These categories are not mutually exclusive; the Russian revolution of 1917 began with urban revolution to depose the Czar, followed by rural revolution, followed by the Bolshevik coup in November. Katz also cross-classified revolutions as follows;
Central; countries, usually Great powers, which play a leading role in a Revolutionary wave; e.g. the USSR, Nazi Germany, Iran since 1979.
Aspiring revolutions, which follow the Central revolution
subordinate or puppet revolutions
rival revolutions, e.g. communist Yugoslavia, and China after 1969
Central and subordinate revolutions may support each other militarily, as for example the USSR, Cuba, Angola, Ethiopia, Nicaragua and other Marxist regimes did in the 1970s and 1980s.

A further dimension to Katz's typology is that revolutions are either against (anti-monarchy, anti-dictatorial, anti-capitalist, anti-communist, anti-democratic) or for (pro-fascism, pro-liberalism, pro-communism, pro-nationalism etc.). In the latter cases, a transition period is often necessary to decide on the direction taken.

Periodisation
There is no consensus on a complete list of revolutionary waves.  In particular, scholars disagree on how similar the ideologies of different events should be in order for them to be grouped as part of a single wave, and over what period a wave can be considered to be taking place – for example, Mark N. Katz discussed a "Marxist-Leninist wave" lasting from 1917 to 1991, and a "fascist wave" from 1922 to 1945, but limits an "anti-communist wave" to just the 1989 to 1991 period.

Pre-19th century

 Republican waves in Rome (509 BCE), Athens (508 BCE), and Carthage (480 BCE).

The Second Reformation (1566–1609), including the Revolt of the Netherlands and the Second and Third Wars of Religion in France.
Jihadist wars in Western Africa in 16. century
The Thirty Years' War (1618–1648), including Calvinist uprisings and the Huguenot Wars in France.
The Atlantic Revolutions occurring at the end of the 18th century, including the American Revolution (1776), the French Revolution (1789), the Haitian Revolution (1791), the Batavian Revolution (1795) and the Irish Rebellion of 1798. Also in this era, Pitt's India Act of 1784 established the India Board to supervise the East India Company, a system which lasted until the Indian Rebellion of 1857; and the Sikh Empire was founded by Ranjit Singh in 1799.

19th century
The Latin American wars of independence, including the various Spanish American wars of independence of 1810–1826 were often seen as inspired at least in part by the American and French Revolutions in terms of their liberal Enlightenment ideology and aims, are counted as the second part of the Atlantic Wave.
The Revolutions of 1820, also the Decembrist revolt of 1825 in Russia and the Greek War of Independence.
The Revolutions of 1830, such as the July Revolution in France and the Belgian Revolution or November Uprising against the Russian rule in Poland.
The Revolutions of 1848 throughout Europe, following the February Revolution in France.
The early 1850s saw the Taiping Rebellion in China, Great Revolt in India and Eureka Rebellion in Australia.
In the 1860s, Italian unification, the German Unification Wars, the Spanish Revolution of 1868, the US Civil War (sometimes referred to as the 'Second American Revolution'), the Meiji restoration in Japan, and the Chinese Taiping rebellion, followed in 1870–71 by the collapse of the French Second Empire and replacement by the French Third Republic.
 The Royal Titles Act of 1876, establishing imperial rule in India; the Anglo-Egyptian War of 1882; the founding of the Italian Empire in 1882; the Third Anglo-Burmese War of 1885, unifying British rule in Burma; the Scramble for Africa from 1885; and the founding of French Indochina in 1886.
The Great Eastern Crisis, including the Herzegovina uprising, April Uprising, Razlovtsi insurrection and the Cretan Revolt.

20th century

The Revolutions of 1905–11 in the aftermath of the Russo-Japanese War, including the Russian Revolution of 1905, the Argentine Revolution of 1905, the Persian Constitutional Revolution, the Young Turk Revolution, the Greek Goudi coup, the Monegasque Revolution, the 5 October 1910 revolution in Portugal, the Mexican Revolution, and the Xinhai Revolution in China involved nationalism, constitutionalism, modernization, and/or republicanism targeting autocracy and traditionalism.
The Revolutions of 1917–1923 in the aftermath of World War I, including the Russian Revolution and the emergence of an international communist party alliance in the Soviet-led Comintern (the beginning of the Marxist revolutionary wave), the collapse of the German Empire, Austro-Hungarian empire and Ottoman empire and resultant founding of Yugoslavia, Czechoslovakia and independent Poland and Austria; the first protest of the Indian independence movement organized by Mohandas Karamchand Gandhi, the Kemalist revolution in Turkey; the Arab revolt, the Easter rising and Irish Free State; as well as other nationalist, populist and socialist uprisings and protests worldwide.
The Fascist Revolutionary wave, beginning in Italy in 1922, also including the 28 May 1926 coup d'état in Portugal, Japan from 1931, Germany from 1933, Greece from 1936, and the Spanish Civil War.
World War II Revolutions (19431949), including the Greek Civil War, French Resistance, Yugoslav Resistance, and Soviet takeovers in Eastern Europe.
The Indochina Wars were communist revolutions in East Asia and Southeast Asia including the Indonesian National Revolution in 1945; all were associates of the Marxist revolutionary wave 
The decolonisation of Africa were waves of revolution in Africa, cresting in the 1970s, including the communist revolutions and pro-Soviet military coups in Somalia, the Congo-Brazzaville, Benin and Ethiopia, and the fight of the communist parties allied under CONCP against the Portuguese Empire in the Portuguese Colonial War.
The Arab nationalist movement: revolutions occurred in Egypt, 1952; Syria, 1958; Iraq, 1958; Algeria, 1962; North Yemen, 1962; Sudan and Libya, 1969. The central regime in this case was Egypt, inspired especially by Gamal Abdel Nasser.
Following Nikita Khrushchev's "Secret Speech" denouncing Stalin in February 1956, a wave of political upheavals swept through the Eastern Bloc. In Poland, a workers' uprising in Poznań led to major political changes later that year, as the longtime Stalinist old guard of the Polish United Workers' Party was forced out of power in favor of a new, more independent-minded Communist leadership. Pro-reform movements in Hungary, inspired in part by the Polish upheavals, soon erupted into the Hungarian Revolution of 1956, a major popular uprising against the Soviet-backed regime in Budapest that was brutally crushed.  There was also a nascent pro-reform movement in Romania that was suppressed.  
The Black Power movement and the civil rights movement organized successful protests against government and private discrimination. Continuing unrest in African-American communities led to the multi-city riots during the "Long, hot summer of 1967" and the various 1968 riots following the assassination of Martin Luther King Jr. In Trinidad the Black Power Revolution was successful.
The Protests of 1968 saw youth movements worldwide supporting the opposition to the U.S. involvement in the Vietnam War and other left wing causes, the worldwide counterculture of the 1960s and the New Left inspired protest and revolution in the communist world and capitalist world, including the Prague Spring, Mao's Cultural Revolution in China, and the May 1968 protests in France; the latter led to the Werner Report on European monetary union.
The Carnation Revolution in Portugal (April 25, 1974) put an end to the oldest dictatorship in Western Europe (it lasted 48 years).
The Central American crisis saw a socialist movement take power in the Nicaraguan Revolution and leftist popular uprisings in El Salvador and Guatemala.
 A decade of religious fundamentalist revolutions, mostly from 1977-1987, including the Shia Islam Iranian revolution of 1979, revisionist Zionism, neo-Zionism, and the 1977 first Likud government in Israel; the Christian right and Christian Zionism movements, mostly in the US, and the Hindutva Janata party, later the BJP, in India, founded 1977. In the 1980s, Al Qaeda, founded 1988; Hamas, founded 1987; Islamic Unity of Afghanistan Mujahideen, founded 1981 or 1985; Lashkar-e-Taiba was founded in Pakistan in 1987. The modern version of the Taliban began in 1994.
The Revolutions of 1989 and the dissolution of the Soviet Union by the end of 1991, which ended the Marxist revolutionary wave, resulting in Russia and 14 countries declaring their independence from the Soviet Union: Armenia, Azerbaijan, Belarus, Estonia, Georgia, Kazakhstan, Kyrgyzstan, Latvia, Lithuania, Moldova, Tajikistan, Turkmenistan, Ukraine, and Uzbekistan. Communism soon was abandoned by other countries, including Afghanistan, Albania, Angola, Benin, Bulgaria, Cambodia, Congo-Brazzaville, Czechoslovakia, East Germany, Ethiopia, Hungary, Mongolia, Mozambique, Poland, Romania, Somalia, South Yemen, and Yugoslavia. Apartheid South Africa, Yugoslavia, and Czechoslovakia also collapsed in the early 1990s.
Pink Tide in Latin America starting in 1999 to late 2000s.

21st century
The colour revolutions were various related movements that developed in several societies in the former Soviet Union and the Balkans during the early 2000s.
Between 2009 and 2014, there were revolutions or mass protests in the Arab world, Iceland, Madagascar, Ireland, Iran, Thailand, Kyrgyzstan, Greece, Spain, Chile, the Maldives, California, China, Israel, Azerbaijan, Armenia, Rojava, Mexico, Canada, the UK, Romania, Turkey, France, Ukraine, Venezuela, Burkina Faso and Hong Kong. This period also saw the Occupy movement form in the West and the autodefensas in Mexico.
The Arab Winter is a violent mass reaction following the Arab Spring characterized by resurgent authoritarianism, dictatorships, and Islamic extremism in the Middle East since 2014.
Late 2019 and 2020 saw a significant wave of protest movements in Hong Kong, Catalonia, Lebanon, Chile, Algeria, Bolivia, Haiti, Iraq, Ecuador, Montenegro, Serbia, Bulgaria, Indonesia, Albania, Sudan, Venezuela, the United States, Kyrgyzstan, Nigeria, Argentina, Iran, Cuba, and the Yellow Vests Movement in various European countries. The causes are varied, spanning from corruption, austerity, electoral fraud, inequality and democratic backsliding. Central themes in many of these protests include economic and racial equality and widespread resentment against the economic and political elite, as well as the opposition to the COVID-19 lockdowns and related measures.

In Marxism  
 Marxists see revolutionary waves as evidence that a world revolution is possible.  For Rosa Luxemburg, "The most precious thing… in the sharp ebb and flow of the revolutionary waves is the proletariat's spiritual growth. The advance, by leaps and bounds, of the intellectual stature of the proletariat affords an inviolable guarantee of its further progress in the inevitable economic and political struggles ahead."

Potential revolutionary waves

Mark Katz theorises that Buddhism (in Sri Lanka, Thailand, Indochina, Burma, Tibet) and Confucianism (to replace Marxism in China and promote unity with Chinese in Taiwan, Hong Kong, Singapore, Malaysia) might be the revolutionary waves of the future. In the past, these religions have been passively acquiescent to secular authority; but so was Islam, until recently.

Katz also suggests that nationalisms such as Pan-Turanianism (in Turkey, Central Asia, Xinjiang, parts of Russia), 'Pan-native Americanism' (in Ecuador, Peru, Bolivia, Paraguay) and Pan-Slavism (in Russia, Ukraine, Belarus) could also form revolutionary waves.

See also

References

External links
Deborah Jerome, Can Tunisia Spark a Revolutionary Wave?, Council on Foreign Relations analysis brief, January 18, 2011.
Mark Kosman, Is revolution back on the agenda?

 
Marxist terminology
Revolution terminology